Rāmañña Nikāya (also spelled Ramanya Nikaya) was one of the three major Buddhist orders in Sri Lanka. It was founded in 1864 when Ambagahawatte Saranankara, returned to Sri Lanka after being ordained by the Neyyadhamma Munivara Sangharaja of Ratnapunna Vihara in Burma. It was one of three Sri Lankan orthodox Buddhist monastic orders, along with Siam Nikaya and Amarapura Nikaya. On 16 August 2019, the Amarapura and Rammana Nikaya were unified as the Amarapura–Rāmañña Nikāya, making it the largest Buddhist fraternity in Sri Lanka.

Similar orders
Rāmañña Nikāya was said to be similar to the Thammayut Nikaya order of Thailand. Rāmañña Nikāya is currently survived in Thailand, Burma and Sri Lanka.

The Most Ven. Napana Premasiri Thero was appointed the Head of the Rāmañña Nikāya on 3 September 2012 following the demise of Venenerable Weweldeniye Medhalankara Thera aged 103.

Rāmañña Nikāya was established on 12 June 1864 in participation with Ven. Ambagahawatte Indaasabhawara Gaanasaami Maha Thera, Ven.Puwakdandawe Paññānanda, Ven.Warāpitiye Sumitta thera.

First Maha Nayaka Thero - Most Ven. Ambagahawatte Indrasabhawara Gnanasami Maha Thera.
Main Station - Mūla Maha Viharaya, Payagala, Kalutara.

Ascetic Tendency
In the beginning, the Majority of monasteries of Rāmañña Nikāya were forest monasteries. Although many village temples have been emerged in modern days, the forest tradition is still being continued by Sri Kalyani Yogasrama Samstha of Rāmañña Nikāya which is the most strictest forest tradition in Sri Lanka.

Resistance to Modernization
Though it has been impossible to resist completely, many old and simple traditions have been still survived in Rāmañña Nikāya. The monks of the Nikaya can be distinguished by the traditions such as using palm leaf umbrellas and alms bowls and covering both shoulders while traveling. "Ramanna nikaya had its own distinctive style. They used begging bowls instead of plates. Instead of umbrellas, they used folded palmyrah leaves, in the form of “bogava”.  The bogava introduced by Ambagahawatte was made usable by CB Nugawela, chairman of the Up country Sabha for the Protection of Nikaya. They wore robes that were   dyed according to the traditional rules."

Forest Dwelling and Meditation Practice
Many of the well known 'Forest Meditation Masters' and 'Forest Monasteries' are said to be in the former Rāmañña Nikāya. Most ven. Puwakdandawe Paññānanda Maha Thera was the pioneer of forest dwellers of Ramanna Nikaya. Most ven. Kadavedduve Jinavamsa Maha Thera was a well-known founder of Sri Kalyani Yogasrama Samstha the major forest sect of Ramanna Nikaya.

Most ven. Matara Sri Gnanarama Maha Thera, Most ven. Matale Silarakkhita Maha Thera. Most ven. Madawala dhammatilaka and Most ven. Nauyane Ariyadhamma Maha Thera were well-known meditation masters of Rāmañña Nikāya Forest Tradition.

Mahanayaka Theros of Rāmañña Nikāya 
The following is a list of Mahanayaka theros of Sri Lanka Ramanna Nikaya.
Ven. Ambagahawatte Indrasabhawara Gnanasami Maha Thera (1880–1886)  
Ven. Deepegoda Saddammawara Jothipala Seelakkandabidhana Maha Thero (1887-1916)   
Ven. Obadakannde Siri Vimalananda Maha Thero (1917-1924)   
Ven. Matara Gnanindasaba Maha Thero (1924-1937)   
Ven. Kodagoda Upasenabhidhana Maha Thero (1937-1939)   
Ven. Matale Dhammasiddhi Maha Thero (1939-1940)   
Ven. Karathota Siri Indasarathissa Maha Thero (1941-1954)   
Ven. Hisselle Siri Gnanodaya Maha Thero (1954-1966)   
Ven. Deepegoda Chandavimala Maha Thero (1966-1976)   
Ven. Induruwe Uttharanandabidhana Maha Thero (1976-1986)   
Ven. Pottewela Pannasara Maha Thero (1986-1997)   
Ven. Weweldeniye Medhalankara Maha Thero (1998–2012)   
Ven. Napana Pemasiri Maha Thero (2012–2020)  
Ven. Makulewe Wimala Maha Thero (2020–present)

See also
 Sri Lankan Buddhism
 Amarapura–Rāmañña Nikāya
 Ambagahawatte Indrasabhawara Gnanasami Maha Thera

References

External links
 Official website of the Sri Lanka Rāmañña Nikāya
 Official website of Ven. Weweldeniye Medhalankara Thera
The Princeton Dictionary of Buddhism by Robert E. Buswell Jr., Donald S. Lopez Jr.,Princeton University Press,Princeton,2014,p. 696 :

Religious organizations established in 1864
Theravada Buddhist orders
Schools of Buddhism founded in Sri Lanka
1800s establishments in Sri Lanka
2019 disestablishments in Sri Lanka